Caithness General Hospital is a rural general hospital operated by NHS Highland, located in Wick, Caithness, Scotland. It is managed by NHS Highland.

History
The hospital became operational in 1986 to replace the previous Caithness Central Hospital. A new Day Case Unit was opened by Sam Galbraith in 1999. A CT scanner service was introduced in August 2008.

The hospital formerly had a consultant-led maternity unit, but stringent application of clinical risk assessment criteria meant that in 2012 and 2013 around 30% of pregnant women in the Caithness area needed to travel to Raigmore Hospital in Inverness to give birth. In November 2016 the NHS Highland board approved the introduction of a community midwifery unit.

Services

Capacity
The hospital has the capacity to accommodate 68 inpatients: 20 medical beds, 42 surgical beds, and 6 beds in the midwifery unit. Its services include: 24-hour Accident & Emergency department, assessment and rehabilitation, general medicine, general surgery, midwifery and palliative care.

Emergency surgical services
In December 2014 the health board announced that emergency surgical services would not be available at night or weekends from 15 December 2014, due to a lack of suitable consultant cover. A meeting between the health board and community leaders to discuss staff shortages was then scheduled for 6 January 2015.

Community midwife unit 
In January 2017, the hospital completed the introduction of a midwife-led unit. , there are an estimated 136 births a year at the hospital; it has full accreditation as baby friendly, since November 2009.

Hospital radio
Radio Remedy is a volunteer-run radio station based at the hospital.

References

External links 
 

Hospital buildings completed in 1986
NHS Highland
NHS Scotland hospitals
Hospitals in Highland (council area)
Buildings and structures in Caithness
Wick, Caithness